Lužce is a municipality and village in Beroun District in the Central Bohemian Region of the Czech Republic. It has about 100 inhabitants.

Geography
It lies in the Hořovice Uplands. There is a set of small ponds, fed by the Karlický Stream.

Gallery

References

Villages in the Beroun District